Mozaffari Protected Area is a protected area in west of Ferdows County in South Khorasan province. It is located 40 kilometers west of Ferdows city.

Polond desert and Ferdows Hole-in-the-Rock are located in Mozaffari Protected Area.

Gallery

References

Protected areas of Iran
Tourist attractions in Ferdows County
Ferdows County
Geography of South Khorasan Province